Villa de Aragón is a station on Line B of the Mexico City Metro system. It is located in the  Gustavo A. Madero municipality, in the limits with the State of Mexico. In 2019, the station had an average ridership of 14,456 passengers per day.

General information
The station was opened on 15 December 1999 and was the temporary northern terminus of the line, until its expansion towards Ciudad Azteca in November 2000.

Villa de Aragón serves the Villa de Aragón and San Juan de Aragón neighborhoods in the Gustavo A. Madero municipality in the north of Mexico City.

Name and pictogram
The station is located in the Villa de Aragón neighborhood, hence the name. Villa de Aragón's pictogram depicts a collection of houses.

Ridership

References

External links
 

Mexico City Metro Line B stations
Mexico City Metro stations in Gustavo A. Madero, Mexico City
Railway stations opened in 1999
1999 establishments in Mexico
Accessible Mexico City Metro stations